Stefan Edberg won the singles tennis title at the 1990 Paris Open after the defending champion Boris Becker retired in the final, with the scoreline at 3–3.

Seeds
A champion seed is indicated in bold text while text in italics indicates the round in which that seed was eliminated. All sixteen seeds received a bye to the second round.

Draw

Finals

Top half

Section 1

Section 2

Bottom half

Section 3

Section 4

External links
 1990 Paris Open draw

Singles